Krista Lawlor  is an American philosopher and Henry Waldgrave Stuart Memorial Professor of Philosophy at Stanford University. She is known for her works on  philosophy of mind and epistemology.

Books
 Assurance: An Austinian View of Knowledge and Knowledge Claims (2013)
 New Thoughts about Old Things: Cognitive Policies as the Ground of Singular Concepts (2001)

References

External links

Living people
21st-century American philosophers
Stanford University faculty
Philosophers of mind
University of Michigan alumni
Tufts University alumni
University of New Hampshire alumni
Year of birth missing (living people)